Hypolycaena kadiskos, the scarce hairstreak, is a butterfly in the family Lycaenidae. The species was first described by Hamilton Herbert Druce in 1890. It is found in Ghana, southern Nigeria, Cameroon, Uganda and north-western Tanzania. The habitat consists of forests.

References

Butterflies described in 1890
Hypolycaenini
Butterflies of Africa